R K Vij is a 1988 batch (41 RR) retired IPS Officer of the Chhattisgarh Cadre. He has just retired from the post of Director General of Police on December 31, 2021.

References

External links

>Prakash, O. (2014). THE USE OF TECHNOLOGY BY THE MAOISTS IN THE CONFLICT AGAINST THE STATE IN INDIA. Proceedings of the Indian History Congress, 75, 1277–1284. http://www.jstor.org/stable/44158519

Indian Police Service officers
Indian police chiefs
1961 births
Living people